ONE on Prime Video 3: Lineker vs. Andrade (also known as ONE Fight Night 3) was a combat sport event produced by ONE Championship that took place on October 22, 2022 at the Axiata Arena in Kuala Lumpur, Malaysia.

Background

This is the first time in the past 2 years the organization has hosted an event outside of Singapore and return to Axiata Arena in Kuala Lumpur, Malaysia, for the first time since ONE: Mark Of Greatness in December 2019.

The event was originally expected to be headlined by a ONE Middleweight World Championship bout between current champion Reinier de Ridder (also the current ONE Light Heavyweight World Champion) and promotional newcomer Shamil Abdulaev. However, Abdulaev forced to withdraw due to not medically cleared and the bout was cancelled.

A ONE Bantamweight World Championship bout between then champion John Lineker and Fabrício Andrade took place at the event. After the original main event was cancelled, the bout served as the main event. At the weigh-ins, Lineker weighed in at 145.75 pounds, 0.75 pounds over the limit. As a result, Lineker was stripped of the title and only Andrade was eligible to win it.

The event featured two new title fights for the inaugural ONE Lightweight Muay Thai World Championship bout between the current ONE Lightweight Kickboxing Champion Regian Eersel vs. Sinsamut Klinmee and for the inaugural ONE Lightweight Submission Grappling World Championship bout between the 2022 ADCC World Championship 77kg gold medalist Kade Ruotolo vs. Uali Kurzhev took place at the event.

The event announced from live ONE on Prime Video 2 added the ONE Flyweight Muay Thai World Grand Prix Tournament Final bout between Superlek Kiatmuu9 and Panpayak Jitmuangnon. The winner will be the tournament champion and will be the next challenger ONE Flyweight Muay Thai title against Rodtang Jitmuangnon. They met previously 7 times in muay thai at Rajadamnern Stadium and Phetchbuncha Stadium, with Panpayak winning four fight encounters, Superlek winning two fight and one fight ended from draw. However, Superlek withdrawn from the event due to training injuries and the bout was postponed.

At weigh-ins, Lea Bivins missed weight, coming in at 116.74 lbs, 1.74 pounds over the limit, Jeremy Miado came in at 127 lbs, 2 pounds over the limit, with both bouts continuing at catchweights and Bivins and Miado paying fines to their opponents. Uali Kurzhev missed hydration twice and a catchweight of 174 lbs was established, with Kurzhev inable to win the inaugural ONE Lightweight Submission Grappling World Championship.

Results

Bonus awards
The following fighters received $50,000 bonuses.
Performance of the Night: Kade Ruotolo, Shamil Gasanov, Mehdi Zatout and Noelle Grandjean

See also 

 2022 in ONE Championship
 List of ONE Championship events
 List of current ONE fighters

References 

Events in Kuala Lumpur
ONE Championship events
2022 in mixed martial arts
Mixed martial arts in Malaysia
Sports competitions in Malaysia
October 2022 sports events in Malaysia